Rocktaves1 is a semi-professional rock festival organised in India at the university level. Held every year in BITS, Pilani during its annual cultural fest Oasis, it has served as a platform for upcoming Indian bands, launching many bands to fame. Bands like Parikrama, Indian Ocean, Prestorika and Euphoria have risen to fame after winning Rocktaves. In 2008, Lounge Piranha, a rock band from Bangalore promoted their new album during Rocktaves.

The event usually starts at around midnight and ends in the early morning.

References
 1http://www.jammag.com/campus/oasis.htm
 2http://mutiny.in/category/entertainment/music/
 3http://www.loungepiranha.com/newsmain.htm

External links
Rocktaves Web Link
Oasis Official Website
BITS-Pilani Official Website

Indian rock music
Music competitions in India